I am a werewolf cub is a 1972 Swedish children's novel by Gunnel Linde illustrated by Hans Arnold. It was translated to English by Joan Tate.

Plot introduction
Ulf was bitten in his leg when stealing apples. He read the Book of Werewolves and understands he turns into a werewolf at full moon. His family notices that the previously timid Ulf is now talking back and sneaks out at night.

References

1972 Swedish novels
Swedish fantasy novels
Swedish horror fiction
Werewolf novels
Swedish-language novels
1972 children's books